Lollipop is the debut single album recorded by South Korean boy band Imfact. The single album was released as a digital download on January 27, 2016, by Star Empire Entertainment and distributed by KT Music, and as a physical album on January 28, 2016.

Commercial performance 
Lollipop entered at number 6 on the Gaon Album Chart on the chart issue dated January 24–30, 2016. On the monthly edition of the same chart, the album appeared at number 30 with 2,270 physical copies sold for the month of January.

Track listing

Charts

Weekly charts

Sales

Release history

References

External links
 

2016 EPs
Genie Music EPs
Korean-language EPs
Single albums